Mn Artists is a platform of the Walker Art Center that supports Minnesota’s local artist community by nurturing arts writing and relationship building. Through Mn Artists and other initiatives, the Walker champions the regional art community by forging connections between locally-rooted artistic practices and national and international conversations in contemporary art, while spotlighting the rigor and vitality of the local arts scene.

In line with the Walker’s mission to catalyze artists and audiences, Mn Artists centers artistic risk, experimentation, and interdisciplinary forms of making, with a particular focus on the arts of our time. Relaunched in 2021, mnartists. walkerart.org features essays, reviews, poetry, ethnographic writing, news, conversations, and maintains the most comprehensive listing of artist opportunities in the state. Mn Artists supports a range of perspectives and nurtures constructive criticism, contributing to lively, professional discussion in the local arts ecosystem.

History
Jointly conceived in 2001 by the Walker Art Center and the McKnight Foundation, the initiative began as a democratic platform for artists of all disciplines and all career stages to share their work online. Throughout its history, Mn Artists has maintained an independent editorial voice and offered a platform for artists through user-generated content.

 2001: Launch of mnartists.org, a digital directory of artists, joint project of the Walker Art Center and the McKnight Foundation
 2000s: Site expands to include collections, news and articles, online forums, events calendar, email newsletter
 Mid-2000s to early 2010s: Program expands to include offline events at the Walker and in partnership with many local organizations
 2014: Relaunch of redesigned mnartists.org, with improved artist profiles, professional development tools, and regional arts writing program
 2017: Mn Artists Presents [Your Name Here] and guest editor program launch, bringing a range of artists’ voices to the platform
 2021: Walker Art Center launches a new site focusing on arts writing and publishing, mnartists.walkerart.org.

See also
Walker Art Center

References

Organizations based in Minnesota